This is a ranked list of the ten largest trading partners of Germany in 2019, based on data from the Federal Statistical Office of Germany (Destatis). In 2016, China became Germany's largest trading partner and has retained that spot for the years since then (2016, 2017, 2018, 2019).

See also
Economy of Germany
List of the largest trading partners of the European Union
List of the largest trading partners of the United States
List of the largest trading partners of the ASEAN
List of the largest trading partners of China
List of the largest trading partners of Russia
List of the largest trading partners of United Kingdom
List of the largest trading partners of Italy

References

Foreign trade of Germany
Economy-related lists of superlatives
Lists of trading partners
Economy of Germany-related lists